Sceloporus merriami, commonly known as the canyon lizard, is a species of lizard in the family Phrynosomatidae. The species is native to the south-western United States and northern Mexico.

Etymology
The specific name, merriami, is in honor of American zoologist Clinton Hart Merriam.

Geographic range
S. merriami is found in the United States in the state of Texas, and it is found in Mexico in the states of Chihuahua, Coahuila, Durango, and Nuevo León.

Description
Adults of S. merriami may reach 58 mm (2.2 in) snout-to-vent length (SVL). Including the tail, they may reach 162 mm (6.4 in) in total length. The dorsal scales are small, and the lateral scales are granular.

Dorsally, the canyon lizard is gray, tan, or reddish-brown, matching the rocks on which it lives.  There are four rows of dark spots on the back, and a vertical black line in front of the front leg. Males have blue and black lines on the throat.

Subspecies
The seven recognized subspecies of S. merriami, including the nominotypical subspecies, are:

Sceloporus merriami annulatus H.M. Smith, 1937 – Big Bend canyon lizard 
Sceloporus merriami australis K.L. Williams, H.M. Smith & Chrapliwy, 1960 – southeastern canyon lizard
Sceloporus merriami ballingeri Lemos-Espinal, H.M. Smith, Auth & Chiszar, 2001 – Ballinger's canyon lizard
Sceloporus merriami longipunctatus Olson, 1973 – Presidio canyon lizard
Sceloporus merriami merriami Stejneger, 1904 – Merriam's canyon lizard
Sceloporus merriami sanojae Lemos-Espinal & Chiszar, 2003 – Sanoja's canyon lizard
Sceloporus merriami williamsi Lemos-Espinal, Chiszar & H.M. Smith, 2000 – Williams' canyon lizard

References

Further reading
Behler JL, King FW (1979). The Audubon Society Field Guide to North American Reptiles and Amphibians. New York: Alfred A. Knopf. 743 pp. . (Sceloporus merriami, pp. 524–525 + Plate 368).
Powell R, Conant R, Collins JT (2016). Peterson Field Guide to Reptiles and Amphibians of Eastern and Central North America, Fourth Edition. Boston and New York: Houghton Mifflin Harcourt. xiv + 494 pp. 47 plates, 207 figures. . (Sceloporus merriami, pp. 296–297, Figure 141 + Plate 27).
Stejneger L (1904). "A New Lizard from the Rio Grande Valley, Texas". Proc. Biol. Soc. Washington 17: 17–20. (Sceloporus merriami, new species).
Stejneger L, Barbour T (1917). A Check List of North American Amphibians and Reptiles. Cambridge, Massachusetts: Harvard University Press. 125 pp. (Sceloporus merriami, p. 55).

Sceloporus
Reptiles of Mexico
Reptiles of the United States
Reptiles described in 1904
Taxa named by Leonhard Stejneger